Stian Bogar (born 10 November 1976) is a Norwegian sport shooter.

He participated at the 2018 ISSF World Shooting Championships, winning a medal.

References

External links

Living people
1976 births
Norwegian male sport shooters
ISSF rifle shooters
Sportspeople from Drammen
European Games competitors for Norway
Shooters at the 2015 European Games
21st-century Norwegian people